Kayser is a surname derived from the German imperial title Kaiser (English: emperor). The title Kaiser is in turn derived from the Latin title Caesar, which again is a derivation from the personal name of a branch of the gens (clan) Julia, to which belonged Gaius Julius Caesar, the forebear of the first Roman imperial family. The further etymology is unclear.

Other names with the same origin are Kaiser and Keiser, and Kiser; Keyser is more common as a Dutch spelling, Kiser is more common in Sweden and the United States, and Qaisar is an Arabic version.

 Karl Ludwig Kayser (1808-1872), German philologist and classical scholar
 Adolph H. Kayser (1851–1925), Mayor of Madison, Wisconsin, United States
 Allan Kayser (born 1963), American actor
 Alois Kayser (1877–1944), German missionary
 Benjamin Kayser (born 1984), French rugby player
 Bernhard Kayser (1869–1954), German ophthalmologist.
 Carl Gangolf Kayser (1837–1895), Austrian architect 
 Charles Willy Kayser (1881–1942), German film actor
 Emanuel Kayser (1845–1927), German geologist
 Éric Kayser (born 1964), French baker and food writer
 Fredrik Kayser (1918–2009), Norwegian resistance member during World War II
 Fredrik A. Kayser (1924–1968), Norwegian furniture designer
 Heinrich Kayser (1853–1940), German physicist
 Heinrich Ernst Kayser (1815–1888), German violin pedagogue
 Heinrich Wilhelm Ferdinand Kayser (1833–1919), mine manager in Tasmania, Australia
 Hugo von Kayser (1873–1949), German general
 Leif Kayser (1919–2001), Danish composer and organist
 Mark Kayser, American TV personality
 Max Kayser (1853–1888), German politician
 Max Kayser (born 1918), German violinist 
 Oliver Kayser (born 1973), Austrian fencer
 Ralph Kayser German medical specialist in orthopedics
 Renato Kayser (born 1996), Brazilian football player
 Robert Kayser (1805–1877), German industrialist and banker

Occupational surnames
German-language surnames